Lawrence "Lawrie" Skolrood (born April 2, 1952) is a former tight end and offensive tackle in the Canadian Football League (CFL) for the Saskatchewan Roughriders and Hamilton Tiger-Cats. He played college football at the University of North Dakota.

Early years

Skolrood attended Nutana Collegiate. He accepted a football scholarship from the University of North Dakota, where he played as a tight end. On November 11, 1972, he tallied 7 receptions for 125 receiving yards in a game against Nevada-Las Vegas. As a senior, he was named one of the team captains. He finished his college career with 53 receptions for 634 yards and 3 touchdowns.

In 2001, he was inducted into the University of North Dakota Athletics Hall of Fame.

Professional career

Skolrood was selected by the Dallas Cowboys in the 17th round (438th overall) of the 1974 NFL draft, but opted not to sign with the team.

In 1974, he was signed by the Saskatchewan Roughriders of the Canadian Football League. On June 12, 1975, he was traded to the Hamilton Tiger-Cats in exchange for tight end Bob Richardson.

On September 4, 1979, he was traded to the Saskatchewan Roughriders in exchange for quarterback Tom Clements. He played as a tight end during his first 6 years, posting 160 receptions for 2,244 yards and 7 touchdowns.

In 1980, he was moved to offensive tackle, where he remained for the rest of his career. His offensive line was voted "best offensive line in the CFL" for three straight years. 

In 1988, he announced his retirement after playing in 218 games, which at the time ranked ninth on the All-time CFL list.

External links
 Hall of fame bio

1952 births
Living people
Sportspeople from Saskatoon
Players of Canadian football from Saskatchewan
Canadian football tight ends
Canadian football offensive linemen
North Dakota Fighting Hawks football players
Saskatchewan Roughriders players
Hamilton Tiger-Cats players